The 2016 Continental Beach Soccer Tournament was a beach soccer tournament which took place in Ordos, China on 23–25 August 2016. This was the first time an international tournament was being held in Northern China. All matches were played at the Ordos. Iran won the tournament.

Participating teams
The following 8 teams entered the tournament.

(hosts)

References

2016 in beach soccer